North Lincolnshire Museum (formerly known as Scunthorpe Museum) is a local museum in the town of Scunthorpe, north Lincolnshire, England.

Overview 
The museum is on Oswald Road, near the Scunthorpe railway station.
It is run by North Lincolnshire Council. The museum has interactive exhibits and covers archaeology, nature, the Victorian era, and war time. It is housed in the former Frodingham vicarage, built in 1874 on the site of Frodingham Hall. There is also a modern extension to the museum.

It re-opened in February 2016 after undergoing a £150,000 refurbishment.

Gallery

See also 
 List of museums in Lincolnshire
Ethel Rudkin

References

External links 
 North Lincolnshire Museum

Houses completed in 1874
Museums in Lincolnshire
Local museums in Lincolnshire
Buildings and structures in Scunthorpe